The Aeronautics Defense Dominator is an Israeli Medium-Altitude Long-Endurance (MALE) unmanned aerial vehicle (UAV) manufactured by Aeronautics Defense Systems. It is based on the Austrian Diamond DA42 Twin Star passenger aircraft. Dominator UAV executes intelligence, surveillance and reconnaissance (ISR) operations.

Operational history
The aircraft made its first test flight in July 2009.

Operators
 — 2 Dominator XPs 
 - Ordered in August 2018 
  - 1 Dominator 2, being used to monitor borders.

Specifications

See also

References

External links
 Aeronautics Defense Systems Ltd.
 Israeli Weapons

2000s Israeli military reconnaissance aircraft
Unmanned military aircraft of Israel
Medium-altitude long-endurance unmanned aerial vehicles
Dominator
Low-wing aircraft
Diesel-engined aircraft